Buding (Lorraine Franconian: Bëddéngen) is a commune in the Moselle department in Grand Est in northeastern France.

The locality of Elzing (German: Elzingen) is incorporated in the commune.

Population

See also
 Communes of the Moselle department

References

External links
 

Communes of Moselle (department)